This is a list of the winners of First Grade Rugby League Premiership competitions held on the Central Coast of New South Wales, Australia.

The current competition is conducted under the auspices of the Central Coast Division Rugby League, an affiliate of NSW Country Rugby League and the New South Wales Rugby League.

First Grade Premiers

Background
Football matches under Rugby Union rules were played by clubs from Gosford, Ourimbah and Wyong in the years 1905, 1906 and 1907. From 1908 to 1911, Wyong entered a team in the Newcastle Rugby Union competitions.
 
During 1911 Gosford Football Club played both Union and League matches. Rugby League teams from the NSWRFL lower grade competitions visited and played against Gosford: Balmain on July 15 and South Sydney Federal on September 2.

Wyong joined the Newcastle Rugby League competition in 1912, competing in Second Grade that season and in 1913 and 1914.

1915 to 1936
The first Rugby League association on the Central Coast was inaugurated in May 1915. Competition matches were played in June. Ourimbah defeated Erina in a Final on August 29. The other teams competing were Matcham, Wyong and Yarramalong.

No competition took place in 1916 or 1917 and in 1918 only a few matches were played.

Competition Rugby League was revived in 1919. The season format was to conduct a premiership competition, in which all teams played the same number of matches, followed by a knock-out. From 1920 until 1932, the Knock-Out involved all teams. 

Gaps in the table in 1927 and 1929 are due to the limited availability of issues of the Gosford Times in those years. A list of previous winners was, however, published in the Wyong Advocate in 1932.

In 1928 the Association decided to hold only a Second Grade competition. Ourimbah and Wyong fielded two teams. Gosford entered their First Grade team in the North Sydney Juniors competition and their Second Grade competed in the local competition. In 1931, however, a newspaper article stated that Wyong had won the last four first grade competitions. This suggests that the local competition of 1928 was elevated to First Grade status.

In 1933 Kincumber won a Knock-Out Final but premiers Morisset were able to challenge them in a Grand Final.

In 1934 a Club Competition was conducted and given prominence. Points from both grades counted, though first grade points were worth double (i.e. four points for a win). Wyong and Morisset initially finished level on 59 Club Championship points.

A play-off final was held, which Morisset won. However, on appeal to the parent body, Newcastle Rugby League, a protest that the local association had dismissed was overturned. Wyong were awarded an additional four points for a first grade game they had lost, in which Ourimbah fielded an unregistered player.

Earlier in 1934 Woy Woy defeated a depleted Ourimbah team by 102 to nil in a First Grade match.

1937 to 1939
In 1932 Gosford Football Club began playing challenge matches, separate from the competition matches played on Saturdays. The format was to invite teams from outside the district to play matches at Gosford Showground. The team that defeated Gosford by the biggest margin was invited back at the end of the season to play a grand final for a trophy cup.

Woy Woy left the local competition and adopted this format in 1935, arranging their own challenge matches and grand final each year until 1939. In 1937 they ran the challenge in two grades, with the B grade team named Ettalong. In 1939, both grade teams in the Woy Woy challenge cup were named Ettalong.

Competition in a league format did not take place between 1937 and 1939. A meeting of the Erina Shire Rugby Football League in May 1937 decided to suspend the competition,  attributing to a decline of interest in Saturday football to a rise in SP betting. The lodgement of protests had become common in the mid 1930s and this may have also contributed.
 
Gosford's 1939 Challenge Cup Grand Final was postponed due to the outbreak of war.

1940 to 1946
Challenge Cup matches were played in 1940 mostly by Gosford and Ourimbah. Wyong club was revived and played a few games. Ettalong played at least one match, visiting Ourimbah on May 19.

Just seven issues of the Gosford Times are available for the seven years, 1941 to 1948, so information on Central Coast football during this time is limited. Ourimbah and Woy Woy hosted challenge matches in 1941. Rugby League in the years 1942 to 1944 may have been restricted to school football – Gosford High School hosted Randwick in July 1943.

Wyong competed in the Newcastle Third Grade competition in 1945, along with ten other teams. They made the semi-finals, playing at Newcastle Sports Ground on August 25, but were beaten, 14 to 8, by Newcastle's Northern Suburbs club.

The following year, 1946, Wyong fielded two grade sides in a Southern Newcastle competition. Two rounds of matches were played against the four other competitors. Wyong's A grade team finished third, between finalists Belmont and Morisset, and Cardiff and Lake Macquarie. In B grade, Wyong upset minor premiers Belmont in the final, prompting a Grand Final the following week.

On September 1, 1946 Ourimbah won Gosford's Challenge Cup, by 6 to 3, but lost their own Cup grand finals the following Sunday, being beaten 19 to 8 by BHP Newcastle in A grade, and 18 to nil by Central Newcastle's Under 18 team in B grade.

1947 to 2009
In February 1947 an annual meeting of the Brisbane Water Rugby League Football Association elected office bearers.  By early April, a draw was published, now under the name Central Coast Rugby League Football Association. The five clubs in the 1947 competition were Morisset, Ourimbah, The Entrance, Woy Woy and Wyong.  Gosford continued to run their challenge cup in 1947 but joined the local league in 1948. Erina club was formed to enter the 1949 competition. Morisset, however, did not participate in 1949.

The format involved the completion of a league of regular season matches to determine the minor premier. The top four teams were then to play in a final series to determine the major premier. Initially, if the minor premier was beaten in either their semi-final or the final, they had a right to challenge the winner of the final in a Grand Final.

From 1950 to 1966, the Grades were more commonly referred to as A, B, C and D.

C and D grades were intended for the development of younger players. This was formalised in 1967 when they became  and Under 17 competitions. The first in a number of changes to the age limits occurred in the following season, 1968.
  competitions have been held in 1967, 1979–1982, 2000–2008, 2010-2011 and 2014–present.
  competitions have been held in 1968–1978, 1983–1999, 2009 and 2012–2013.
 Under 17 competitions have been held in 1967, 1979–1982, 2000–2008, 2010-2011 and 2013. Since 2014, Under 17 competitions have been run by the junior association.
 Under 16 competitions were run by the senior association from 1968 to 1978. From 1983, Under 16 competitions have been run by the junior association.

The Second Division competition was played on Saturdays, while the five other grades continued to be played on Sundays. The second division had a mix of teams from the district clubs, as well as Davistown, Toukley, Milson Island and Munmorah.

 became  in 1977. Third Grade returned in 1978 and ran, but for a two-year gap in the early 1980s, until 1999. Second Division ran until 2005. In 2009, an  competition was held.

In 2001, The Entrance and Woy Woy finished the regular season on equal points. Despite The Entrance having the superior points difference, Woy Woy were declared winners in the minor premiership by virtue of winning the major semi-final.

Clubs
Toronto participated from 1954 to 1959. Rathmines in 1955 and South Lakes in 1958. Combined Wyong-Morisset teams competed in 1957, with Wyong dropping out in 1958 before reorganising and returning in 1960. Umina first entered teams in 1964. Mount Penang fielded Under 18 teams from 1969 to 1975. Saint Edwards College fielded Under 16 teams in 1971, 1972 and 1974. Terrigal-Wamberal became the eighth district club in 1976 and Toukley the ninth in 1979. Munmorah fielded first grade teams in 1981 and 1982, but dropped back to second division in 1983.

The 1990s saw a number of changes to participation in the First Grade competition. Munmorah returned in 1992, were renamed as Northern Lakes in 1994 but dropped out in 1998. Berkeley Vale joined in 1995. Toukley dropped back to Second Division in 1995. Umina were unable to field a senior team in the three seasons between 1996 and 1998. Gosford's last season in First Grade was 1999.

In 2003, The Entrance, Erina, Ourimbah and Woy Woy entered teams in the Jim Beam Cup. This meant that their second side participated in the CCDRL First Grade competition. Woy Woy played two seasons, Ourimbah two and a half (withdrawing mid-season in 2005) and Erina five. The Entrance were the most successful of the four Central Coast clubs, winning three premierships (2003, 2007 & 2014) in two stints (2003-2007 and 2010-2014). Also in 2003, Wyong joined the Newcastle competition and fielded teams in both competitions until 2006.

In 2004, the Kincumber Colts entered First Grade and Northern Lakes and Umina returned, after gaps of six and one seasons, respectively. With Second Division discontinued in 2006, Central Wyong and Toukley entered First Grade.

2010 to Present
During this period First Grade, Reserve Grade, Open Age and youth competitions have been held. The number and ages in the youth competitions have varied. Since 2014, the senior body has run Under 19s and the junior body Under 17s.
A ladies league tag competition commenced in 2015 and was won by Kincumber. That competition and its teams are included in the number of grades and teams in this table.

In 2012, two Under 18 competitions were held, Under 18/1s was won by The Entrance and Under 18/2s was won by Kincumber.

Acronyms
 G = Number of Grades
 C = Number of Clubs
 T = Number of Teams.
 1GT = Number of First Grade Teams
 W&DRL = Wyong and District Rugby League, WDRFL = Wyong District Rugby Football League
 GDRFL = Gosford District Rugby Football League, GDFA = Gosford District Football Association
 ESDRFL = Erina Shire District Rugby Football League, ESRFL = Erina Shire Rugby Football League
 CCRLFA = Central Coast Rugby League Football Association, CCDRL = Central Coast Division Rugby League

Sources

Digitised newspapers at the National Library of Australia's Trove website
  Gosford Times and Wyong District Advocate
  The Newcastle Herald
Whilst not used extensively in the production of this list, Microfilm of the following newspapers are available at the State Library of New South Wales and Central Coast Council libraries at Gosford and Wyong. The RAV numbers provided are those used by the State Library. 
  Gosford Times (RAV 24 - Reels #1, 1897-1900; #31 to #40, 1955 to 1962)
  Central Coast Express (RAV 61) 
  The Guardian (The Entrance and Wyong) (RAV 63 - Reels #1 and #2, 1933-1959 miscellaneous) 
  Wyong and Lakes District Advocate (RAV 178 - Reel #2, 1932-1956 miscellaneous)
 Erina Rugby League Football Club
 Woy Woy Roosters
 Fox Sports Pulse
 The following books are available at the Tuggerah Branch of the Central Coast Council Libraries
 
 
 Recollection.

References

Central Coast Rugby League First Grade Premiers
Australian rugby league lists
Rugby League First Grade Premiers